John Jones, D.D.  was Dean of Bangor from 1727 until 1750.

Jones was born in Anglesey and educated at Trinity College, Cambridge. He was held the living at Abergwyngregyn and a prebendary of St Asaph.

References

People from Anglesey
Alumni of Trinity College, Cambridge
17th-century Welsh Anglican priests
18th-century Welsh Anglican priests
1759 deaths
Deans of Bangor